Gheorghe Avramescu (26 January 1884 – 3 March 1945) was a Romanian Lieutenant General during World War II. In 1945, he was arrested by the NKVD on the Slovakian front and died in custody the next day.

Early life 
Avramescu was born Botoșani on 26 January 1884, and attended the A. T. Laurian National College between 1898 and 1906. He then enrolled in the Military School of Infantry and Cavalry in Bucharest, graduating in 1908 with the rank of second lieutenant, and being promoted to first lieutenant in 1911. After serving in the Second Balkan War in 1913, he was admitted to the Higher War School, and promoted to captain in 1915.

World War I and Interwar 
When Romania entered World War I in August 1916 on the side of the Allied powers, Avramescu fought with the Dobruja Army, under the command of Russian General Andrei Zayonchkovski, and saw action against the German forces of General August von Mackensen. In November he took command of the 2nd Battalion from the 38th Regiment, and fought in December at the Battle of the Argeș, falling back towards Moldavia in a series of defensive actions. For his valor in these engagements he was awarded in 1917 the Order of the Star of Romania, Knight class. In the summer of 1917 he fought  at the Battle of Mărășești; for his service he was awarded the Order of the Crown, Grand Officer Class, and was promoted to major on 1 September 1917.

In the interwar period he advanced to lieutenant colonel in 1923, colonel in 1929, brigadier general in 1935, and major general in 1940. At various times, he was in command of the 1st Division Vânători de munte, the 10th Infantry Division, and the III Army Corps.

World War II 
Avramescu served as General Officer Commanding of a number of army units: the 10th Division in 1941, the Mountain Corps in June 1941, the III Corps in October 1943, the VI Corps in February 1944, and the 4th Army from 1944 to 1945.

At the head of the Mountain Corps, he participated in Operation München, the Battle of the Sea of Azov, the Crimean campaign,  and the Siege of Sevastopol. After the fall of Sevastopol, his Corps occupied Crimea.

For his service during the Crimean campaign, Avramescu was promoted on 18 July 1942 to lieutenant general (general de corp de armată), and was awarded the Order of the Crown, Grand Officer Class (29 July 1942), the Order of Michael the Brave, 2nd Class (1 September 1942), and the German Cross, in Gold (25 October 1942).

After the crushing defeat in the Battle of Stalingrad, in which he didn't participate, the Romanian Army was driven back to its own country during 1943 and the first half of 1944. In August 1944, on the eve of the Soviet Second Jassy–Kishinev Offensive, he took de facto command of the 4th Army, since general Ioan Mihail Racoviță was "away on leave" (preparing King Michael's Coup). Avramescu could not prevent the disastrous defeat, because of the limited number of armored and motorized units at his disposal, and was dismissed on 23 August and replaced by Ilie Șteflea.

After the Royal Coup, he was recalled to command the 4th Army on the side of the Soviets against the Germans and the Hungarians. He fought many battles with his 4th Army, including the Battle of Turda and the Battle of Debrecen, and was in command at the Battle of Carei, the last engagement of the war within the present borders of Romania.

Avramescu complained repeatedly to the Soviets about the lack of supplies and impossible tasks for his Army. For this, he was relieved of command on 11 January 1945, and put on reserve. Nevertheless, he was promoted to general on 9 February and recalled to duty. Returning to the front, he successfully led the 4th Army in the assault on the Zvolen–Banská Bystrica line, in what was the prelude to the Bratislava–Brno Offensive in Slovakia.

Death
On 2 March 1945, when on the Slovakian front, General Avramescu was summoned by the commander of the Soviet 40th Army. After one hour, the Romanian delegation was told that Avramescu and the 40th Army commander, General Filipp Zhmachenko, left for the command post of the 2nd Ukrainian Front, as they were expected there by Marshal Rodion Malinovsky, leading later commentators to assert General Avramescu was arrested.

The Romanian 4th Army was placed under command of General Nicolae Dăscălescu, who struggled to find out what had happened to Avrămescu. Zhmachenko advised him to find information about Avramescu at the Romanian Ministry of Defence or the Romanian General Staff. Avramescu was killed on March 3, 1945 in an aerial attack on the car which transported him, and his body was buried in Budapest's Soshalom cemetery. The general was the only occupant of the car to be killed. According to the official report issued on March 23, 1945 by NKVD head Lavrentiy Beria, Avramescu was hit by a bullet through the car's windshield.

Also on 3 March 1945, Adela, Avramescu's wife and Felicia Avramescu-Sturdza, his daughter, were arrested and sent to Siberia. His daughter committed suicide; according to Soviet sources, this happened on 6 March 1945. Adela returned to Romania in 1956.

On 23 October 2000, his remains were brought back to Romania and were reburied with military honours at the Hajongard Cemetery of Cluj-Napoca. A bust of Avramescu has been erected in the city's Ștefan cel Mare Square. Streets in Botoșani, Brăila, and Târgu Mureș, as well as a school in Prăjești bear his name. The 24th "General Gheorghe Avramescu" Vânători de munte Battalion is headquartered in Miercurea Ciuc.

References

External links

1880s births
1945 deaths
People from Botoșani
Carol I National Defence University alumni
Romanian Land Forces generals
Romanian military personnel of the Second Balkan War
Romanian military personnel of World War I
Romanian military personnel of World War II
Recipients of the Order of Michael the Brave
Recipients of the Order of Michael the Brave, 2nd class
Knights of the Order of the Star of Romania
Grand Officers of the Order of the Crown (Romania)
Recipients of the Gold German Cross
Recipients of the Iron Cross, 1st class
Recipients of the Iron Cross, 2nd class
Romanian military personnel killed in World War II
Deaths by airstrike during World War II